Sarina Suzuki (鈴木 紗理奈; born July 13, 1977) is a Japanese actress, singer, tarento and former gravure idol.

Career
Born in Osaka, Suzuki debuted first as a gravure idol in 1994. She soon became active on television variety shows, notably serving as a regular on Ninety-nine's hit show  Mecha-Mecha Iketeru! from 1996. She has also been active as a singer, with one of her singles, "Share ni nannai", peaking at number 22 on the Oricon Singles Chart in 1997. She later began recording reggae music under the name Munehiro, with one album, Neo, reaching number 26 on the Oricon Albums Chart in 2009. She won the Best Lead Actress in a Foreign Language Film at the Madrid International Film Festival in 2017.

References

External links
Dramacrazy profile

1977 births
Living people
Japanese actresses
Japanese gravure idols
Japanese television personalities
Japanese reggae musicians
Musicians from Osaka Prefecture
People from Settsu, Osaka
21st-century Japanese singers
21st-century Japanese women singers
Japanese YouTubers